Lino Banfi  (born Pasquale Zagaria on 9 July 1936) is an Italian film actor and presenter. He has appeared in more than 100 films since 1960.

Biography
He was born in the Apulian city of Andria and at the age of three, moved to Canosa di Puglia. Lino Banfi became one of the most well-known actors in Italian "sexy comedies" in the 1970s.

During his career, nearly all of Lino Banfi's characters spoke with the distinctive pronunciation of the Bari dialect. Bandi and his wife Lucia Lagrasta were married since 1962 until her death in February 2023; they have two children: Walter and Rosanna, who is also an actress. In 2000, Lino Banfi became a Goodwill Ambassador for the Italian National Committee for UNICEF.

Filmography

Films

Howlers of the Dock (1960)
Sedotti e bidonati (1964)
 Two Escape from Sing Sing (1964)
 Goldginger (1965)
 The Two Parachutists (1965)
 Come inguaiammo l'esercito (1965), directed by Lucio Fulci
 002 Operazione Luna (1965), directed by Lucio Fulci
 I due parà (1966), directed by Lucio Fulci
 Due marines e un generale (1966), directed by Luigi Scattini
 A suon di lupara (1968), directed by Luigi Petrini
 I due pompieri (1968), directed by Bruno Corbucci
 I nipoti di Zorro (1968), directed by Marcello Ciorciolini
 I due deputati (1968), directed by Giovanni Grimaldi
 Zum zum zum - La canzone che mi passa per la testa (1969), directed by Bruno Corbucci
 Zum zum zum n° 2 (1969), directed by Bruno Corbucci
 Indovina chi viene a merenda? (1969), directed by Marcello Ciorciolini
 Lisa dagli occhi blu (1969), directed by Bruno Corbucci
 Gli infermieri della mutua (1969), directed by Giuseppe Orlandini
 Oh dolci baci e languide carezze (1969), directed by Mino Guerrini
 Franco e Ciccio sul sentiero di guerra (1969), directed by Aldo Grimaldi
 Certo certissimo ... anzi probabile (1969), directed by Marcello Fondato
 Il Prof. Dott. Guido Tersilli, primario della clinica Villa Celeste, convenzionata con le mutue (1969 - not accredited), directed by Luciano Salce
 Quelli belli... siamo noi (1969), directed by Giorgio Mariuzzo
 Don Franco e Don Ciccio nell'anno della contestazione (1970), directed by Marino Girolami
 Nel giorno del Signore (1970), directed by Bruno Corbucci
 Mezzanotte d'amore (1970), directed by Ettore Maria Fizzarotti
 Io non scappo... fuggo (1970), directed by Franco Prosperi
 Amore Formula 2 (1970), directed by Mario Amendola
 Ninì Tirabusciò la donna che inventò la mossa (1970), directed by Marcello Fondato
 Mazzabubù... Quante corna stanno quaggiù? (1971), directed by Mariano Laurenti
 Detenuto in attesa di giudizio (1971), directed by Nanni Loy
 Il clan dei due Borsalini (1971), directed by Giuseppe Orlandini
 Scusi, ma lei le paga le tasse? (1971), directed by Mino Guerrini
 Io non spezzo... rompo (1971), directed by Bruno Corbucci
 Il furto è l'anima del commercio...?! (1971[), directed by Bruno Corbucci
 Venga a fare il soldato da noi (1971), directed by Ettore Maria Fizzarotti
 Riuscirà l'avvocato Franco Benenato a sconfiggere il suo acerrimo nemico il pretore Ciccio De Ingras? (1971), directed by Mino Guerrini
 Il terrore con gli occhi storti (1972), directed by Steno
 Continuavano a chiamarli i due piloti più matti del mondo (1972), directed by Mariano Laurenti
 Boccaccio (1972), directed by Bruno Corbucci
 Il prode Anselmo e il suo scudiero (1972), directed by Bruno Corbucci
 Il brigadiere Pasquale Zagaria ama la mamma e la polizia (1973), directed by Luca Davan
 Peccato veniale (1973), directed by Salvatore Samperi
 L'altra faccia del padrino (1973), directed by Franco Prosperi
 4 marmittoni alle grandi manovre (1974), directed by Franco Martinelli
 Il trafficone (1974), directed by Bruno Corbucci
 Sesso in testa (1974), directed by Sergio Ammirata
 L'esorciccio (1975), directed by Ciccio Ingrassia
 Colpo in canna (1975), directed by Fernando Di Leo
 Stangata in famiglia (1976), directed by Franco Nucci
 L'affittacamere (1976), directed by Mariano Laurenti
 Basta che non si sappia in giro (1976) - "Il superiore" episode, directed by Luigi Magni
 La compagna di banco (1977), directed by Mariano Laurenti
 Orazi e Curiazi 3 - 2 (1977), directed by Sergio Ammirata
 Kakkientruppen (1977), directed by Marino Girolami
 L'insegnante balla... con tutta la classe (1978), directed by Giuliano Carnimeo
 L'insegnante va in collegio (1978), directed by Mariano Laurenti
 La liceale nella classe dei ripetenti (1978), directed by Mariano Laurenti
 La soldatessa alle grandi manovre (1978), directed by Nando Cicero
 L'insegnante al mare con tutta la classe (1979), directed by Michele Massimo Tarantini
 L'infermiera di notte (1979), directed by Mariano Laurenti
 Sabato, domenica e venerdì (1979) - "Sabato" episode, directed by Sergio Martino
 La liceale, il diavolo e l'acquasanta (1979), directed by Nando Cicero
 Tutti a squola (1979), directed by Pier Francesco Pingitore
 La liceale seduce i professori (1979), directed by Mariano Laurenti
 La poliziotta della squadra del buon costume (1979), directed by Michele Massimo Tarantini
 L'insegnante viene a casa (1979), directed by Michele Massimo Tarantini
 L'infermiera nella corsia dei militari (1979), directed by Mariano Laurenti
 La ripetente fa l'occhietto al preside (1980), directed by Mariano Laurenti
 La moglie in vacanza... l'amante in città (1980), directed by Sergio Martino
 La moglie in bianco... l'amante al pepe (1980), directed by Michele Massimo Tarantini
 Zucchero, miele e peperoncino (1980), directed by Sergio Martino
 La dottoressa ci sta col colonnello (1980), directed by Michele Massimo Tarantini
 Spaghetti a mezzanotte (1981), directed by Sergio Martino
 L'onorevole con l'amante sotto il letto (1981), directed by Mariano Laurenti
 Cornetti alla crema (1981), directed by Sergio Martino
 Fracchia la belva umana (1981), directed by Neri Parenti
 Vieni avanti cretino (1982), directed by Luciano Salce
 Dio li fa e poi li accoppia (1982), directed by Steno
 Pappa e ciccia (1982), directed by Neri Parenti
 Vai avanti tu che mi vien da ridere (1982), directed by Giorgio Capitani
 Ricchi, ricchissimi, praticamente in mutande (1982), directed by Sergio Martino
 Al bar dello sport (1983), directed by Francesco Massaro
 Occhio, malocchio, prezzemolo e finocchio (1983), directed by Sergio Martino
 L'allenatore nel pallone (1984 - also screenplay), directed by Sergio Martino
 I pompieri (1985), directed by Neri Parenti
 Grandi magazzini (1986), directed by Castellano & Pipolo
 Scuola di ladri (1986), directed by Neri Parenti
 Il commissario Lo Gatto (1986), directed by Dino Risi
 Roba da ricchi (1987), directed by Sergio Corbucci
 Missione eroica - I pompieri 2 (1987), directed by Giorgio Capitani
 Bellifreschi (1987), directed by Enrico Oldoini
 Com'è dura l'avventura (1988), directed by Flavio Mogherini
 L'allenatore nel pallone 2  (2008 - also screenplay), directed by Sergio Martino
 Un'estate al mare (2008), directed by Carlo Vanzina
 Focaccia blues (2009), directed by Nico Cirasola
   (2009), directed by 
 Buona giornata (2012), directed dy Carlo Vanzina

TV
 Il giornalino di Gian Burrasca (1964)
 Il triangolo rosso (1969)
 Arrivano i mostri (1977)
 Il superspia (1977)
 Se Parigi... (1982)
 Il vigile urbano (1989, Rai 1)
 Aspettando Sanremo (1990, Rai 1)
 Un inviato molto speciale (1992, Rai 2)
 Nuda proprietà vendesi (1997, Rai 1)
 Vola Sciusciù (2000, Rai 1 - subject also)
 Piovuto dal cielo (2000, Rai 1)
 Angelo il custode  (2001, Rai 1)
 Un difetto di famiglia (2002, Rai 1)
 Il destino ha 4 zampe (2002, Rai 1)
 Un posto tranquillo (2003, Rai 1)
 Raccontami una storia (2004, Rai 1)
 Un posto tranquillo 2  (2005, Rai 1)
 Il mio amico Babbo Natale (2005, Canale 5)
 Il padre delle spose (2006, Rai 1)
 Il mio amico Babbo Natale 2 (2006, Canale 5)
 Scusate il disturbo   (2009, Rai 1)
 Un medico in famiglia (1998–2013, Rai 1)
 Tutti i padri di Maria (2010, Rai 1)
 Il commissario Zagaria (2011, Canale 5)

Books
  (1991)
  (2004)
  (2004)
  (2006)
  (2009)

Honours 
 : Knight Grand Cross of the Order of Merit of the Italian Republic (27 December 1998)

Notes

References

External links

1936 births
Living people
Italian male film actors
UNICEF Goodwill Ambassadors
People from Andria
People from Canosa di Puglia
20th-century Italian male actors
21st-century Italian male actors
Knights Grand Cross of the Order of Merit of the Italian Republic